Stephen "Steve" Nemesh (31 December 1896 in Szécsény, Hungary – 18 September 1975 in San Bernardino, California) was a Hungarian-born open-wheel racecar driver, who emigrated to the United States and competed as an American. His only American Championship car racing start was the 1926 Indianapolis 500 where he drove an Argyle powered Schmidt chassis. He started 22nd and was sidelined after completing 41 laps by transmission failure. He was credited with 21st place. He drove as a relief driver in the 1927 Indianapolis 500 for Dave Evans.

In addition, Nemesh competed in the 1921 Pikes Peak Hill Climb, driving a Paige Special as a teammate to Ralph Mulford.

Nemesh was born István Nemes but anglicized his name on becoming a US citizen in 1924.

Indy 500 results

References

External links
 

1896 births
1975 deaths
People from Szécsény
Hungarian racing drivers
American racing drivers
Indianapolis 500 drivers
Sportspeople from Nógrád County
Hungarian emigrants to the United States